Chathuranga Sanjeewa Madushan is a Sri Lankan international footballer who plays as a defender for Navy Sea Hawks in the Sri Lanka Football Premier League.

References

Sri Lankan footballers
Living people
Sri Lanka international footballers
Association football defenders
1993 births
Sri Lanka Football Premier League players